Tommaso Morosini (born 8 October 1991) is an Italian professional footballer who plays as a midfielder for  club Sangiuliano, on loan from Monza.

Club career
Morosini made his Serie B debut for AlbinoLeffe on 30 May 2010 in a game against Reggina.

On 7 January 2020, he joined Monza on loan. If he reached agreed performance targets, Monza was obligated to purchase his rights permanently at the end of the loan. Those targets were met, and Monza purchased his rights. On 21 September 2020, Morosini was sent on a one-year loan to Feralpisalò.

On 26 August 2021, Morosini was sent on a one-year loan to Lecco. On 18 July 2022, he moved on loan to Sangiuliano, newly promoted to Serie C.

Honours 
Monza
 Serie C Group A: 2019–20

References

External links
 

1991 births
Living people
Sportspeople from the Province of Bergamo
Footballers from Lombardy
Italian footballers
Association football midfielders
U.C. AlbinoLeffe players
A.C. Prato players
Bassano Virtus 55 S.T. players
Ascoli Calcio 1898 F.C. players
U.S. Catanzaro 1929 players
Savona F.B.C. players
Virtus Bergamo Alzano Seriate 1909 players
Piacenza Calcio 1919 players
F.C. Südtirol players
A.C. Monza players
FeralpiSalò players
Calcio Lecco 1912 players
F.C. Sangiuliano City players
Serie B players
Serie C players
Serie D players